Mostafapur Union is a Union Parishad under Moulvibazar Sadar Upazila of Moulvibazar District in the division of Sylhet, Bangladesh. It has an area of 21 square kilometres and a population of 18,053.

History 
The union was named after the village of Mostafapur. The village was named in honour of Shah Mustafa, an Islamic preacher and companion of Shah Jalal, who came to Moulvibazar to propagate the light of Islam. The house where he initially started residing is now known as Mostafapur Puran Bari.

Geography 
Mostafapur Union is located at the eastern part of Moulvibazar Sadar Upazila. It shares borders with the Kanakpur and Amtail Unions in the west, Rajnagar Upazila in the east, Chadnighat Union in the north, and Giyashnagar Union in the south. It has an area of 21 square kilometres.

Demography 
Mostafapur has a population of 18,053.

Administration 
Mostafapur constitutes the no. 11 union council of Moulvibazar Sadar Upazila. It contains 33 villages and 12 mouzas.

Villages 
 Hilalpur, Shompashi, Ghorua, Bahar Mordan, Kuchar Mahal, Gandarvpur, Lamajagannathpur, Pagoliya
 Mostafapur, West Mostafapur, Kamarshuta, North Jagannathpur, Goalabari, Shonapur, Jagannathpur
 Kotar Mahal, Harinarayanpur, Goyghor, Sribour, Fotehpur, Baurghoriya, Khojar Mahal, Birbali
 Badeshompashi, Ekagopal, Jinaikaist, Jagatshi, Changaon, Folaun, Komla Kolosh, Mutukopur, Ajmeru, Ramabollav

Economy and tourism 
Mostafapur has a significant number of British and American immigrants contributing to its economy. It has one central bazaar. In the village of Goyghor, there is an ancient mosque from the Mughal era called Goyghor Mosque. There is also a large ecopark in Shonapur.

Education 
The Union has a literacy rate of 60%. It has 10 state primary schools and 2 private primary schools. It has one exam centre for the Junior Dakhil Certificate (JDC) in Hilalpur High School. There are three madrasas and

Language and culture 
The native population converse in their native Sylheti dialect but can also converse in Standard Bengali. Languages such as Arabic and English are also taught in schools. The Union contains 8 eidgahs.

List of chairmen

References

Unions of Moulvibazar Sadar Upazila